Alexander Stewart Webb may refer to:

 Alexander S. Webb (1835–1911), army officer and Medal of Honor recipient
 Alexander Stewart Webb (banker) (1870–1948), American banker and philanthropist